Douglas Randall Sisk (born September 26, 1957), is a former Major League Baseball relief pitcher. His primary pitch was a sinker that was difficult for batters to drive in the air.

Early years
Sisk earned all-league honors both seasons he spent playing college baseball at Green River Community College. In his first season of professional baseball with the Kingsport Mets, Sisk went 8–5 with a 2.66 earned run average as a starting pitcher. He was moved into the bullpen the following season with the Lynchburg Mets.

New York Mets
Sisk made his Major League debut on September 6 against the Pittsburgh Pirates, pitching a scoreless inning. On September 15, he faced one batter, Andre Dawson, in an extra innings contest with the Montreal Expos. Dawson took him deep to left field for his first career loss. Over the remainder of the season, Sisk pitched six innings, and allowed just one hit, picking up his first career save on September 22 against the Chicago Cubs.

The  season opener marked the return of Tom Seaver in a Mets uniform. Seaver pitched six scoreless innings, matched by fellow future Hall of Famer Steve Carlton. Sisk entered in the seventh, and held the Philadelphia Phillies scoreless for the combined shutout. Meanwhile, the Mets broke through with two in the seventh to give Sisk his first career win. For the season, he went 5–4 with a 2.24 ERA as the right-handed complement to Jesse Orosco. His eleven saves were second to Orosco's seventeen.

He was having a similarly stellar  season until he developed a sore shoulder. Through June 8, Sisk had allowed only three earned runs through 53.2 innings pitched for an 0.47 ERA. His ERA crept up to 1.40 by the time he took the mound to face the Cubs on July 28.

The Mets were in first place in the National League East, 4.5 games up on the Cubs. Sisk entered the game in the eighth with the score tied at three. He walked the first batter he faced. He uncorked a wild pitch before giving up singles to the next two. He then misplayed a bunt for an error before exiting the game to a booing Shea Stadium crowd. Shortly afterwards, he was placed on the disabled list. He was effective upon his return (9.1 IP, 2 ER), but was by then a target of the Shea Stadium boo birds despite ending the season with a 2.09 ERA.

Opposing batters were hitting .337, and his ERA was 8.53 when he was sent down to triple A Tidewater in early May. Despite going 0–2 with a 7.20 ERA for the Tidewater Tides, he returned to the Mets in late May. By then, Roger McDowell had emerged as the right-handed closer for the Mets, and Sisk was pretty much relegated to "mop up duty."

Shortly after his return, he pitched his best game of the season (4 IP, 1 hit) for his second save, This was followed by three consecutive losses, the second of which came against the rival St. Louis Cardinals. Entering a 1–1 tie in the thirteenth inning, Sisk allowed six runs (5 ER). From there, he settled down, going 3–0 with a 2.95 ERA until elbow surgery ended his season in mid-September.

The elbow surgery had Sisk rehabbing in Tidewater to start the  season. After nine games and thirty innings, Sisk returned to the Mets in late May. In his first appearance, he allowed two runs in one inning in a 10–2 blowout at the hands of the San Francisco Giants. From there, he went 2–1 with a 0.47 ERA in nine appearances through July 2. A rough month of July (5.30 ERA) cost his the trust of manager Davey Johnson, and he spent the rest of the season pitching almost exclusively in blowouts. That said, he pitched well, going 2–0 with a 2.62 ERA and one save. He did not allow a home run all season.

In the postseason, Sisk pitched a scoreless inning in game four of the 1986 National League Championship Series and a scoreless .2 of an inning in game two of the World Series, both losses.

Sisk had a decent  season (3–1, 3.46 ERA, 3 SV), but was still being used for mop up duty by Davey Johnson, and was still drawing the ire of the fans. As the ire began to spill more and more off the field, he requested a trade. After the season, he was sent to the Baltimore Orioles for minor league pitcher Blaine Beatty and a player to be named later.

Baltimore Orioles
The 1988 Orioles got off to a historically bad start. They set a modern record by losing their first 21 games to start the season. Sisk actually pitched well during that stretch. He lost one game, and allowed three earned runs in 14.1 innings. He was 3–2 with a 3.22 ERA when tendinitis cost him a month of the season. After a brief rehab stint in triple A, he pitched thirteen innings before allowing a run. However, he then began developing knee problems, and had a 6.10 ERA over his final fifteen appearances.

Overall, he went 3–3 with a 3.72 ERA. He led the Orioles bullpen with 94.1 innings in relief, and tied for the team lead in appearances with 52. After the season, he had reconstructive surgery on both knees that caused him to miss the entire  season.

Atlanta Braves
After the surgery, Sisk's career went through something of a whirlwind that briefly had him back with the Mets. He signed as a free agent with the Cleveland Indians prior to Spring training . After posting a 7.04 ERA in eight appearances with the triple A Colorado Springs Sky Sox, he was released, and re-signed with the Mets. He was 5–1 with a 2.81 ERA at Tidewater when he was traded to the Atlanta Braves for minor leaguer Tony Valle on July 22. He appeared in three games for the Braves, pitching 2.1 innings, and allowing one run.

On April 16, Sisk got his first major league win in nearly three years against the Astros. He would go 2–1 with a 5.02 ERA before tendinitis landed him back on the DL. He played nine games for the triple A Richmond Braves, but never returned to the majors. He was released at the end of the season.

Career stats

During his nine-year major-league career, Sisk allowed only 15 home runs in over 500 innings. His only career run batted in came on June 11, 1985. The Mets were already losing 16–0 in the second inning when Sisk entered the game. Batting in the third inning, Sisk grounded out to shortstop Steve Jeltz. Clint Hurdle scored from third for the Mets' first run. Sisk also pitched 2.1 scoreless innings that allowed the Mets to cut the deficit to 16–7. He was lifted in the fifth for a pinch hitter. Promptly afterwards, the Phillies scored ten more off Joe Sambito.

He was part of the notorious "Scum Bunch" as a Met, along with Orosco and left fielder Danny Heep.

Following the 1994–95 Major League Baseball strike, baseball's owners were set to go into the  season with "replacement players". The 37 year old attended training camp with the Mets until the strike ended on March 28.

After which, he became the athletic director of the Lakewood, Washington Boys and Girls Club in 2003, a position which he no longer holds. He currently works as a sales representative for Unique Wine Company, a large wine importer and distributor based out of Sisk's home town of Renton, Washington.

References

External links
, or Baseball Almanac, or The Ultimate Mets Database, or Pura Pelota (Venezuelan Winter League)
Doug Sisk at the Society for American Baseball Research

1957 births
Living people
Atlanta Braves players
Baltimore Orioles players
Baseball players from Tacoma, Washington
Colorado Springs Sky Sox players
Green River College alumni
Green River Gators baseball players
Jackson Mets players
Kingsport Mets players
Lynchburg Mets players
Major League Baseball pitchers
New York Mets players
People from Lakewood, Washington
Sportspeople from Renton, Washington
Richmond Braves players
Rochester Red Wings players
Baseball players from Atlanta
Sportspeople from King County, Washington
Sportspeople from Manhattan
Baseball players from New York City
Tiburones de La Guaira players
American expatriate baseball players in Venezuela
Tidewater Tides players
Washington State Cougars baseball players
Washington State University alumni